Meaghers Grant is a rural community in the Musquodoboit Valley region of the eastern Halifax Regional Municipality Nova Scotia on Route 357 . The community is located on the Musquodoboit River and the economy is mainly farming and forestry. It is approximately 45 minutes away from Halifax, the province's capital city. The River Oaks Golf course is located there.

History
Meaghers Grant was land owned by Captain Martin Meagher (name pronounced Mar, though community pronounced MY-ers) in the 18th century. John Dunbrack was the first person to build a frame house in the Meaghers Grant area, and he and his wife were granted Gibraltar, an area south of Meaghers Grant by Captain Martin Meagher in 1786.

Communications
The postal Code is B0N 1V0
The telephone exchange is 902 384

Attractions

Meaghers Grant Fire Hall
River Oaks Golf Course and Lodge
Old Mechanical Garage (Previous owner: Weldon Cole)
Meaghers Grant United Church
Meaghers Grant Community Hall

References

Communities in Halifax, Nova Scotia
General Service Areas in Nova Scotia